Chulpan 2-y (2-se Sulpan) is a rural locality (a village) in Kucherbayevsky Selsoviet, Blagovarsky District, Bashkortostan, Russia. The population was 134 as of 2010. There is 1 street.

Geography 
Chulpan 2-y is located 43 km northwest of Yazykovo (the district's administrative centre) by road. Novoabzanovo is the nearest rural locality.

References 

Rural localities in Blagovarsky District